Dewaele is a surname. Notable people with the surname include:

 David Dewaele (1976–2013), French actor
 David Dewaele (musician) (born 1975), Belgian musician, member of Soulwax
 Stephen Dewaele (born 1970), Belgian musician, member of Soulwax

See also
 De Waele